The National League B is the second highest league in Swiss floorball. 

The men's NLB is composed of 12 teams and the women's league of 10 teams. The next higher league is the Unihockey Prime League and the next lower is the First Division.

Teams 

Teams in season 2022/23:

Men 

 Ad Astra Obwalden
 Floorball Fribourg
 Kloten-Dietlikon Jets
 Regazzi Verbano UH Gordola
 RD March-Höfe Altendorf
 Ticino Unihockey
 UHT Eggiwil
 UHC Grünenmatt
 UHC Lok Reinach
 UHC Sarganserland
 UHC Thun
 Unihockey Langenthal Aarwangen

Women 
 Aergera Giffers
 Chilis Rümlang-Regensdorf
 Floorball Uri
 Nesslau Sharks
 UC Yverdon
 UH Red Lions Frauenfeld
 UH Lejon Zäziwil
 UH Appenzell
 Unihockey Basel Regio
 Visper Lions

External links 
 NLB Men on swissunihockey.ch
 NLB Women on swissunihockey.ch

References 

Floorball competitions in Switzerland